This is a list of player transfers involving Pro14 rugby union teams between 12 March 2020 and the end of the 2020–21 season. Unlike in previous seasons where the bulk of player transfers occurred between seasons, a large number of player transfers instead took place mid-season due to the disruption caused by the coronavirus pandemic.

Benetton

Players in
 Callum Braley from  Gloucester
 Niccolò Cannone from  Petrarca Padova
 Joaquin Riera from  Petrarca Padova
 Luca Petrozzi from  San Donà
 Edoardo Padovani from  Zebre
 Ivan Nemer from  Rugby Casale
 Paolo Garbisi from  Petrarca Padova
  Thomas Gallo from  Olimpia Lions
 Gianmarco Lucchesi from  Lions Amaranto Livorno
 Zac Nearchou from  Wasps (season-long loan)
 Corniel Els from  Bulls

Players out
 Giuseppe Di Stefano to  Fiamme Oro
 Antonio Rizzi to  Zebre
 Tito Tebaldi to  Petrarca Padova
 Alessandro Zanni retired 
 Dean Budd retired
 Marco Fuser to  Newcastle Falcons
 Nasi Manu to  Otago
 Engjel Makelara to  Petrarca Padova
 Ian McKinley retired
 Ian Keatley to  Glasgow Warriors
 Eli Snyman to  Leicester Tigers

Bulls

The Bulls will join the Pro14 for the Pro14 Rainbow Cup having departed Super Rugby. All signings and departures listed have occurred following the conclusion of the Super Rugby Unlocked competition.

Players in
 Marcell Coetzee from  Ulster 
 Madosh Tambwe from  Sharks
 Henco Beukes from  Blue Bulls U21
 Jandre Burger from  Blue Bulls U21
 Werner Gouws from  Blue Bulls U21
 Keagan Johannes from  Blue Bulls
 Dawid Kellerman from  Blue Bulls
 Richard Kriel from  Blue Bulls U21
 Jaco Labuschagne from  Blue Bulls U21
 Jay-Cee Nel from  Blue Bulls
 Marnus Potgieter from  Blue Bulls
 WJ Steenkamp from  Blue Bulls
 Janko Swanepoel from  Blue Bulls
 Janco Uys from  Blue Bulls U21
 Zak Burger from  Griquas
 Mhleli Dlamini from  Crusaders
 James Verity-Amm from  Griquas
 Diego Appollis from  Blue Bulls U21
 Reinhardt Ludwig from  Blue Bulls U21
 Simphiwe Matanzima returned from injury
 Raynard Roets from  Blue Bulls U21
 Harold Vorster from  Panasonic Wild Knights
 Robert Hunt from  Ikey Tigers
 Sidney Tobias unattached

Players out
 Juandré Kruger released
 Dayan van der Westhuizen to  Hino Red Dolphins
 Corniel Els to  Benetton
 Jason Jenkins returned to  Toyota Verblitz
 Jade Stighling to  Blue Bulls
 Marcel van der Merwe to  La Rochelle (short-term deal)

Cardiff Blues

Players in
 Luke Scully from  Worcester Warriors
 Cory Hill from  Dragons
 Rhys Carré from  Saracens
 Will Davies-King promoted from Academy
 Mason Grady promoted from Academy
 Iestyn Harris promoted from Academy
 Alun Lawrence promoted from Academy
 Max Llewellyn promoted from Academy
 Teddy Williams promoted from Academy
 Ellis Bevan from  Cardiff Metropolitan University 
 Rowan Jenkins from  Aberavon (short-term deal)

Players out
 Macauley Cook to  Jersey Reds
 James Down to  Lokomotiv Penza
 Nick Williams retired
 Kieron Assiratti to  Bristol Bears (short-term loan)
 Filo Paulo to  Manawatu
 Rhys Davies released
 Ryan Edwards returned to  Bristol Bears
 Callun James released
 Alex Varney released
 Dan Fish to  Cardiff
 Ioan Davies to  Dragons (short-term loan)
 Luke Scully to  Cornish Pirates (season-long loan)
 Ethan Lewis to  Saracens (season-long loan)
 Scott Andrews to  Worcester Warriors (season-long loan)
 Rowan Jenkins to  Aberavon

Cheetahs

The Cheetahs were due to compete in the 2020–21 Pro14, but due to the COVID-19 pandemic, were unable to compete due to travel restrictions and competed in Super Rugby Unlocked instead. They will not compete in the Pro14 Rainbow Cup either. All signings and players under contracted remained with the side or with the Free State Cheetahs for Super Rugby Unlocked or the 2020–21 Currie Cup Premier Division unless noted below.

Players in

Players out
 Joseph Dweba to  Bordeaux
 Walt Steenkamp to  Bulls
 Gerhard Olivier retired
 Sintu Manjezi to  Bulls
 Justin Basson retired
 Louis Fouché retired
 Rabz Maxwane to  Lions
 Jasper Wiese to  Leicester Tigers
 Benhard Janse van Rensburg to  NEC Green Rockets
 Tapiwa Mafura to  Pumas
 Erich de Jager to  New England Free Jacks
 Dian Badenhorst to  Pumas
 Daniel Maartens to  Pumas
 Luan de Bruin to  Leicester Tigers
 JP du Preez to  Sale Sharks
 Reinach Venter to  Clermont
 Tian Schoeman to  Bath
 Jacques du Toit to  Bath 
 Boan Venter to  Edinburgh

Connacht

Players in
 Sammy Arnold from  Munster
 Jack Aungier from  Leinster
 Óisín Dowling from  Leinster
 Conor Oliver from  Munster
 Conor Dean promoted from Academy
 Jordan Duggan promoted from Academy
 Seán Masterson promoted from Academy
 Niall Murray promoted from Academy
 Colm Reilly promoted from Academy
 Peter Sullivan promoted from Academy
 Alex Wootton from  Munster (season-long loan)
 Ben O'Donnell from  Australia Sevens
 Abraham Papali'i from  Bay of Plenty
 Cormac Daly from  Clontarf

Players out
 Colby Fainga'a to  Lyon
 Tom McCartney retired
 Robin Copeland to  Soyaux Angoulême
 Rory Burke released
 Darragh Leader released
 Angus Lloyd retired
 Conor Hayes released
 Hugh Lane released
 Mikey Wilson released
 Kyle Godwin to  Western Force
 Joe Maksymiw to  Dragons
 David Horwitz to  Randwick
 Niyi Adeolokun to  Bristol Bears
 Peter McCabe to  Bristol Bears
 Eoin McKeon retired
 Luke Carty to  LA Giltinis
 Stephen Kerins to  Bristol Bears (short-term loan)

Dragons

Players in
 Jonah Holmes from  Leicester Tigers
 Nick Tompkins from  Saracens (season-long loan)
 Joe Maksymiw from  Connacht
 Ben Fry promoted from Academy
 Harry Fry from  Gloucester
 Luke Baldwin from  Worcester Warriors (season-long loan)
 Jamie Roberts from  Stormers
 Greg Bateman from  Leicester Tigers 
 Conor Maguire unattached (short-term deal)
 Joe Thomas from  Leicester Tigers (short-term deal)
 Ben Carter promoted from Academy
 Evan Lloyd promoted from Academy
 Aneurin Owen promoted from Academy
 Luke Yendle promoted from Academy
 Dan Baker from  Mont-de-Marsan (short-term deal)
 Gonzalo Bertranou from  Jaguares (short-term deal)
 Ioan Davies from  Cardiff Blues (short-term loan)
 Will Reed promoted from Academy

Players out
 Nic Cudd released
 James Sheekey released
 Tom Hoppe released
 James McCarthy released
 Tyler Morgan to  Scarlets
 Jacob Botica to  Rennes
 Cory Hill to  Cardiff Blues
 Dafydd Buckland to  Pontypridd
 Brandon Nansen to  Brive
 Will Griffiths to  Newport
 Conor Maguire to  Gloucester
 Connor Edwards to  Doncaster Knights (season-long loan)
 Nick Tompkins returned to  Saracens
 Joe Thomas to  Houston SaberCats
 Arwel Robson to  Cornish Pirates (short-term loan)

Edinburgh

Players in
 Jordan Venter from  Paul Roos Gymnasium
 Lee Roy Atalifo from  Jersey Reds
 Matt Gordon from  London Scottish
 Andrew Davidson from  Glasgow Warriors
 Marshall Sykes from  Ayrshire Bulls
 Sam Kitchen from  Ayrshire Bulls
 Connor Boyle promoted from Academy
 Rory Darge promoted from Academy
 Sam Grahamslaw from  Watsonians
 Andries Ferreira from  
 Boan Venter from  Cheetahs
 Freddie Owsley from  Bristol Bears

Players out
 Pietro Ceccarelli to  Brive
 Jason Baggott released
 Matt Scott to  Leicester Tigers
 Stan South returned to  Exeter Chiefs
 Callum Hunter-Hill to  Saracens
 Simon Hickey to  Hurricanes
 Dougie Fife to  New England Free Jacks
 John Barclay retired
 Sam Thomson to  Toshiba Brave Lupus
 Cameron Fenton to  Heriot's 
 Jamie Bhatti to  Bath
 Matt Gordon to  Ealing Trailfinders
 Korie Winters released
 Fraser McKenzie retired
 Rory Darge to  Glasgow Warriors
 Sam Kitchen released
 Nic Groom to  London Irish

Glasgow Warriors

Players in
 Richie Gray from  Toulouse
 Enrique Pieretto from  Exeter Chiefs
 Rufus McLean promoted from Academy
 Hamish Bain from  Stade Niçois
 Dylan Evans from  Scarlets (short-term loan)
 Fotu Lokotui from  Doncaster Knights
 TJ Ioane from  London Irish (loan)
 Ian Keatley from  Benetton
 Dylan Evans from  Scarlets (short-term loan) 
 Cole Forbes from  Bay of Plenty
 Rory Darge from  Edinburgh

Players out
 Jonny Gray to  Exeter Chiefs
 Cameron Henderson to  Leicester Tigers
 Rory Hughes released
 Ruaridh Jackson retired
 Andrew Davidson to  Edinburgh
 Tim Swinson to  Saracens
 Siua Halanukonuka to  Perpignan
 Matt Smith retired
 Nick Frisby to  Western Force
 Petrus du Plessis retired
 Charlie Capps released
 Jale Vakaloloma released
 Callum Gibbins to  Old Glory DC
 Adam Ashe to  LA Giltinis
 D. T. H. van der Merwe to  LA Giltinis
 Glenn Bryce to  LA Giltinis
 Brandon Thomson to  Free State Cheetahs
 Will Hurd to  Leicester Tigers
 Adam Nicol to  Jersey Reds
 Tommy Seymour retired

Leinster

Players in
 Ryan Baird promoted from Academy
 Harry Byrne promoted from Academy
 Jack Dunne promoted from Academy
 Tommy O'Brien promoted from Academy
 Dan Sheehan promoted from Academy
 Ciaran Parker from  Jersey Reds (three-month loan)
 Greg McGrath from  Lansdowne (short-term deal)
 Jamie Osborne from  Naas (short-term deal)
 Marcus Hanan from  Clane (short-term deal)

Players out
 Fergus McFadden retired
 Jack Aungier to  Connacht
 Óisín Dowling to  Connacht
 Roman Salanoa to  Munster
 Gavin Mullin released
 Bryan Byrne to  Bristol Bears
 Barry Daly retired
 Rob Kearney to  Western Force
 Joe Tomane to  Ricoh Black Rams
 Ben Murphy to  Munster (7-week deal)
 Paddy Patterson to  Munster (short-term deal)

Lions

The Lions will join the Pro14 for the Pro14 Rainbow Cup having departed Super Rugby. All signings and departures listed have occurred following the conclusion of the Super Rugby Unlocked competition.

Players in
 Morné Brandon from  Golden Lions U21
 Jarod Cairns from  Golden Lions U21
 Aidynn Cupido from  Golden Lions U21
 Izan Esterhuizen from  Golden Lions U21
 Jordan Hendrikse from  Golden Lions U21
 James Mollentze from  Golden Lions
 Banele Mthenjane from  Golden Lions U21
 Mandisi Mthiyane from  Golden Lions U21
 Lindo Ncusane from  Golden Lions U21
 Luke Rossouw from  Golden Lions U21
 Sibusiso Sangweni from  Golden Lions U21
 Ngia Selengbe from  Golden Lions U21
 Sibusiso Shongwe from  Golden Lions U21
 Ruhan Straeuli from  Golden Lions U21
 Boitumelo Tsatsane from  Golden Lions U21
 Emmanuel Tshituka from  Golden Lions U21
 Dameon Venter from  Golden Lions
 Fred Zeilinga from  Canon Eagles

Players out
 Marvin Orie to  Stormers
 Dylan Smith to  Stade Français
 Elton Jantjies to  Pau (short-term deal)
 Wiehahn Herbst to  Sharks (short-term deal)

Munster

Players in
 Keynan Knox promoted from Academy
 Liam Coombes promoted from Academy
 Alex McHenry promoted from Academy
 Jack O'Sullivan promoted from Academy
 Damian de Allende from  Panasonic Wild Knights
 Matt Gallagher from  Saracens
 RG Snyman from  Honda Heat
 Roman Salanoa from  Leinster
 Diarmuid Barron promoted from Academy Callum Reid from  Ulster (6-week loan) Ben Murphy from  Leinster sub-academy (7-week deal) Ethan Coughlan from  Ennis (short-term deal) Paddy Patterson from  Leinster (short-term deal)Players out
 Arno Botha to  Bulls
 Sammy Arnold to  Connacht
 Conor Oliver to  Connacht
 Alan Tynan released Seán O'Connor to  Jersey Reds
 Ciaran Parker to  Jersey Reds
 Alex Wootton to  Connacht (season-long loan) Darren O'Shea to  Vannes
 Jack Stafford to  Harlequins
 Corrie Barrett to  Bedford Blues 
 Darren Sweetnam to  La Rochelle
 Eoghan Clarke to  Jersey Reds

Ospreys

Players in
 Rhys Webb from  Bath
 Mat Protheroe from  Bristol Bears
 Nicky Thomas from  Bristol Bears
 Rhys Davies from  Bath
 Stephen Myler from  London Irish
 Will Hickey from  St Michael's College
 Jordan Lay from  Bay of Plenty
 Ethan Roots from  North Harbour
 Todd Gleave from  Gloucester (season-long loan)Players out
 James Hook retired Gheorghe Gajion to  Aurillac
 Dan Baker to  Mont-de-Marsan
 Aled Davies to  Saracens
 Ben Glynn released Will Jones released Tom Williams released Lesley Klim to  Jersey Reds
 Guido Volpi to  Doncaster Knights (season-long loan) 
 James King retired Nicky Thomas to  Wasps (short-term loan) Darryl Marfo to  Leicester Tigers
 Hanno Dirksen to  New Orleans Gold
 Scott Otten retiredScarlets

Players in
 Sam Costelow from  Leicester Tigers
 Tyler Morgan from  Dragons
 Sione Kalamafoni from  Leicester Tigers
 Johnny Williams from  Newcastle Falcons
 Morgan Jones promoted from Academy Jac Price promoted from Academy Joe Roberts promoted from Academy Tom Rogers promoted from Academy Will Homer from  Jersey Reds
 Aled Brew from  Bath (short-term deal) Pieter Scholtz from  Southern Kings

Players out
 Corey Baldwin to  Exeter Chiefs
 Tom James retired Rhys Fawcett released Simon Gardiner released Morgan Williams released Hadleigh Parkes to  Panasonic Wild Knights
 Kieron Fonotia to  Tasman
 Jonathan Evans retired Danny Drake to  Gloucester (short-term loan) Dylan Evans to  Glasgow Warriors (short-term loan) Steve Cummins to  Pau
 Aled Brew retired Dylan Evans to  Glasgow Warriors (short-term loan) Joe Roberts to  Ampthill (short-term loan) Shaun Evans to  Nottingham (season-long loan) Harri O'Connor to  Nottingham (season-long loan) Jac Price to  Nottingham (season-long loan) Tevita Ratuva to  Brive

Sharks

The Sharks will join the Pro14 for the Pro14 Rainbow Cup having departed Super Rugby. All signings and departures listed have occurred following the conclusion of the Super Rugby Unlocked competition.

Players in
 Siya Kolisi from  Stormers
 Reniel Hugo from  Cheetahs
 Le Roux Roets from  Pumas
 Wiehahn Herbst from  Lions (short-term deal) Lucky Dlepu from  Western Province U21
 Rynhardt Jonker from  Sharks U21
 Jeandre Labuschagne from  Sharks U21
 Ntuthuko Mchunu from  Sharks U21
 Makazole Mapimpi returned from  NTT DoCoMo Red Hurricanes

Players out
 Tera Mtembu to  New England Free Jacks
 Craig Burden retired Zain Davids to  South Africa Sevens
 Muller du Plessis to  South Africa Sevens
 Lwazi Mvovo retired JP Pietersen retired Madosh Tambwe to  Bulls
 Evan Roos to  Stormers
 Andrew Evans to  Sharks (Currie Cup)
 Cleopas Kundiona to  Sharks (Currie Cup)
 Cameron Wright to  Sharks (Currie Cup)

Southern Kings

The Southern Kings were due to compete in the 2020–21 Pro14 season, but went into voluntary liquidation in September 2020. They will not compete in the Pro14 Rainbow Cup either. All signings and players under contracted were released following liquidation.

Players in

Players out
 Theo Maree to  Griquas
 Howard Mnisi to  Cheetahs
 Demetri Catrakilis retired Rossouw de Klerk to  Bourgoin
 Sarel Pretorius retired Masixole Banda to  Griquas
 Elrigh Louw to  Bulls
 Xandré Vos to  New England Free Jacks
 Cameron Dawson to  Cheetahs
 Jacques du Toit to  Cheetahs
 Thembelani Bholi to  Sharks
 Yaw Penxe to  Sharks
 Alandré van Rooyen to  Griquas
 CJ Velleman to  Griquas
 Bobby de Wee to  Ealing Trailfinders
 Erich Cronjé to  Pumas
 Ig Prinsloo to  Pumas
 Tertius Kruger to  HKG Sandy Bay
 Aaron Brody to  Phoenix
 Luyolo Dapula to  Rhinos
 Gareth Heidtmann to  Phoenix
 JT Jackson to  SX10
 Andell Loubser to  Phoenix
 Eddie Ludick to  Phoenix
 Gavin Mills to  Phoenix
 Pieter Scholtz to  Scarlets
 Aston Fortuin to  Utah Warriors
 Tiaan Botes to  Pumas
 JC Astle to  Rouen
 Lupumlo Mguca to  Eastern Province Elephants
 Josh Allderman to  Eastern Province Elephants
 Christopher Hollis to  Eastern Province Elephants
 Robin Stevens to  Eastern Province Elephants
 Josiah Twum-Boafo to  Eastern Province Elephants
 Courtney Winnaar to  Eastern Province Elephants
 Jerry Sexton to  Doncaster Knights 
 Alulutho Tshakweni to  Cheetahs
 Schalk Ferreira to  Cheetahs
 Stefan Ungerer to  Griquas
 Bader Pretorius to  Jersey Reds 
 Tienie Burger to  Rouen
 Christian Ambadiang to  Nevers
 Tiaan Swanepoel to  Madibaz
 Siya Masuku to  Cheetahs

Stormers

The Stormers will join the Pro14 for the Pro14 Rainbow Cup having departed Super Rugby. All signings and departures listed have occurred following the conclusion of the Super Rugby Unlocked competition.

Players in
 Marvin Orie from  Lions
 Evan Roos from  Sharks
 Willie Engelbrecht from  Pumas (season-long loan) Lee-Marvin Mazibuko from  Western Province
 Ali Vermaak from  Western Province
 Adré Smith from  Griquas
 Andre-Hugo Venter from  Western Province U21
 Rosko Specman from  Cheetahs (short-term deal)Players out
 Jaco Coetzee to  Bath
 Siya Kolisi to  Sharks
 Chris van Zyl retired Ryno Eksteen released JJ Kotze to  Western Province
 Matt More to  Western Province

Ulster

Players in
 Stewart Moore promoted from Academy
 Alby Mathewson unattached
 Ian Madigan from  Bristol Bears
 Bradley Roberts from Rainey Old Boys, initially as short-term injury cover, later permanent.

Players out
 Zack McCall released
 Clive Ross released
 Tommy O'Hagan released
 Angus Kernohan to  Ealing Trailfinders
 Callum Reid to  Munster (6-week loan)
 Marcell Coetzee to  Bulls
 Bill Johnston to  Ealing Trailfinders (short-term loan)
 Louis Ludik retired

Zebre

Players in
 Antonio Rizzi from  Benetton
 Iacopo Bianchi from  Fiamme Oro
 Nicolò Casilio from  Calvisano
 Giovanni D'Onofrio from  Fiamme Oro
 Matteo Nocera from  Fiamme Oro
 Paolo Pescetto from  Calvisano
 Potu Leavasa Jr. from  Counties Manukau
 Charles Alaimalo from  Southland

Players out
 Edoardo Padovani to  Benetton
 Charlie Walker to  Ealing Trailfinders
 Roberto Tenga to  Fiamme Oro
 George Biagi retired
 Francois Brummer released
 Apisai Tauyavuca to  Houston SaberCats
 Paula Balekana to  Houston SaberCats

See also
List of 2020–21 Premiership Rugby transfers
List of 2020–21 RFU Championship transfers
List of 2020–21 Super Rugby transfers
List of 2020–21 Top 14 transfers
List of 2020–21 Major League Rugby transfers

References

2020–21 Pro14
2020-21